The Bibliotheca Alexandrina’s 100 Greatest Egyptian Films is a list compiled in November 2006 by a committee formed by Bibliotheca Alexandrina, which includes Ahmed El Hadari as the committee head, with the membership of Samir Farid and Kamal Ramzi.

List breakdown 

 Salah Abu Seif with eight films, is the most represented director in the list; followed by Youssef Chahine, with seven films and Henry Barakat with four films.

Full list

See also
 Bibliotheca Alexandrina
CIFF Top 100 Egyptian films

References

External links
 Bibliotheca Alexandrina official website

Top film lists
Lists of Egyptian films
Bibliotheca Alexandrina
2006 in Egyptian film